The Foundation audiovisual archive of the labor and democratic movement (AAMOD)is a foundation born in Italy in the late 1970s with the aim of researching, collecting, storing historical audiovisual documents, repertory, current affairs and narrative reconstruction. It works in the field of audiovisuals (cinema, TV, multimedia) to promote the construction of a collective memory of social movements and their protagonists. The foundation organizes research activities and sets up exhibitions on topics related to history and society, curating specialized publications. Its headquarters are in Rome.

The first president of the Foundation was Cesare Zavattini who held this role until his death in 1989.

The audiovisual archive of the labor and democratic movement was founded in 1979 as an association, with the name of the Historical Audiovisual Archive of the workers' movement (ASAMO), and inherits the film heritage of the PCI and Unitelefilm - film production company, linked to the PCI.

In 1983 the archive's heritage was declared of considerable historical interest by the Archives Superintendent for Lazio. It is the first Italian audiovisual archive, which thanks to the consistency and importance of its heritage, receives this notification. In 1985 the Archive was recognized as a foundation, for the need to better protect its heritage: the archive therefore takes on the current name: Audiovisual Archive Foundation of the workers' and democratic movement (AAMOD).

Collections 

The collections include:

 7,000 hours of films, footage and documentaries
 300,000 photographs
 2,000 hours of sound, interviews, speeches and conferences

See also 
 List of film archives
 List of archives in Italy

References

External links 
 Archivio Audiovisivo del Movimento Operaio e Democratico

Film archives in Italy